Émilise Lessard-Therrien is a Canadian politician, who was elected to the National Assembly of Quebec in the 2018 provincial election. She represented the electoral district of Rouyn-Noranda–Témiscamingue as a member of Québec solidaire until her defeat in the 2022 Quebec general election.

In March 2019, Lessard-Therrien in an interview expressed concern over possible land grabs in the province by Chinese nationals. She said that, with climate change, Quebec would be one of the few places left with good, arable land and fresh water in a few years’ time and that the Temiscamingue region had much unexploited land that was being scouted by Chinese nationals. She also said “Between us, we call them predators,” she said. “They are predators of agricultural land. And we see them, we feel them. And what I’m saying is that fallow land still has potential to be farmed again, but land that belongs to China may never feed Quebecers, and it’s important that we be concerned now.”

References

Living people
1991 births
People from Abitibi-Témiscamingue
Québec solidaire MNAs
Women MNAs in Quebec
21st-century Canadian politicians
21st-century Canadian women politicians
Université du Québec en Abitibi-Témiscamingue alumni
Université du Québec en Abitibi-Témiscamingue alumni
Canadian farmers